Francis Burke may refer to:

 Francis Burke (Franciscan) (died 1697), Irish Franciscan friar and writer
 Francis Burke (bishop) (died 1723), Irish Roman Catholic archbishop of Tuam
 Francis Burke (Dean of Elphin) (1834–1904), priest of the Church of Ireland

See also
 Frank Burke (disambiguation)
 Frances Burke (disambiguation)